The HUMUS project (or Hydrologic Unit Modeling of the United States) is a project that was funded by the Natural Resources Conservation Service to model the non-point source loading from 8-digit hydrologic unit cataloging units.

History
Most of the project activity took place from 1992–1996, and work continues to this day through the Conservation Effects Assessment Program (CEAP. The project was led within NRCS by Clive Walker.  The modeling work used the Soil & Water Assessment Tool (SWAT) developed by Jeff Arnold, Jimmy Williams and others at USDA-Agricultural Research Service (ARS) in Temple, Texas.  Additional development support was provided by the Texas A&M Blackland Research & Extension Service AgriLife Center employees Raghavan Srinivasan, Ranjan Muttiah, Paul Dyke, Allan Jones among others.  Mike Hutchinson from the Australian National University was visiting the A&M center at that time and provided assistance with elevation data modeling.  Peter Allen a hydro-geologist from Baylor University was instrumental in sub-surface shallow groundwater modeling.  Significance of the project was the early use of national level Geographic Information Systems (GIS) datasets for environmental assessment.

Further reading
Arnold, J.G., J.R. Williams, A.D. Nicks, and N.B. Sammons. 1990. SWRRB-A basin scale simulation model for soil and water resources management. Texas A&M Press. College Station, TX. 255 pp.
Arnold, J.G. 1990. ROTO-A continuous water and sediment routing model. ASCE Proc. of the Watershed Management Symposium. Durango, CO. 480-488 pp.
Arnold, J.G. ... 1992. Spatial scale variability in model development and parameterization. Ph.D Thesis, Purdue University, West Lafayette, IN. pp 183.
Arnold, J.G., B.A. Engel, and R. Srinivasan. 1993. A Continuous time, grid cell watershed model. In: Proceedings of Application of Advanced Information Technologies for the Management of Natural Resources. Sponsored by ASAE. June 17–19, 1993, Spokane, WA.
Committee on Conservation Needs and Opportunities, 1986. Soil conservation: Assessing the national resource inventory. Volume 1, National Academy Press, Washington, D.C. 114 p.
Rosenthal, W., R. Srinivasan, and J.G. Arnold. 1993. A GIS watershed hydrology model link to evaluate water resources of the Lower Colorado River in Texas. In: Proceedings of Application of Advanced Information Technologies for the Management of Natural Resources. Sponsored by ASAE. June 17–19, 1993, Spokane, WA.
Srinivasan, R. and J.G. Arnold. 1993. Basin scale water quality modeling using GIS. In: Application of Advanced Information Technologies for Management of Natural Resources. Sponsored by ASAE. June 17–19, 1993, Spokane, WA.
U.S. Army. 1987. GRASS reference manual. USA CERL, Champaign, IL.

References

External links
HUMUS project at NASA's Global Change Master Directory

Temple, Texas
Bell County, Texas
United States Department of Agriculture